Elizabeth Rosa Sawtell (née Budden, 6 September 1865 – 20 September 1940) was a New Zealand painter.

Career 

E. Rosa Sawtell worked in watercolours and pencil drawings. Her works were primarily landscapes (often plein-air studies) and portraits.

In 1881 she was one of the foundation students at the Canterbury School of Art and exhibited with the Canterbury Society of Arts between 1882 and 1893 (under the name E. Rosa Budden). She received a silver medal by the Society in 1888 for ‘landscape study from nature’.

From 1894 she became known under the name E. Rosa Sawtell, exhibiting with the Auckland Society of Arts, New Zealand Academy of Fine Arts, and Otago Art Society.

Sawtell was a member of The Group, an informal art association from Christchurch, New Zealand, formed to provide a freer alternative to the Canterbury Society of Arts. She contributed works to exhibitions in 1935, 1936, and 1947 (posthumously).

Works by Sawtell were included in the London British Empire Exhibition (1924) and the New Zealand and South Seas Exhibition, taking place in Dunedin, 1925–1926 (as Mrs Claude Sawtell).

During the 1890s Sawtell was a prominent member of the Palette Club, a Christchurch-based group that promoted plein-air painting among local artists.

In the 1920s Sawtell was the secretary for the Society for Imperial Culture.

Notable works include On the Outskirts of Barton's Bush, Heretaunga, Reminiscences, and The Clay Road.

Personal information 
Known primarily under her married name, E. Rosa Budden changed her surname to Sawtell after marrying Claude Sawtell on 9 January 1894 at Sumner. Her father-in-law was Henry Sawtell, a former mayor of Christchurch (1871–1872). Her husband died in 1917, aged 54. Rosa Sawtell died at her home in the Christchurch suburb of Merivale on 20 September 1940 after a long illness. The Sawtells are buried at Linwood Cemetery.

References

Further reading 

Concise Dictionary of New Zealand Artists McGahey, Kate (2000) Gilt Edge
New Zealand Women Artists: A Survey of 150 Years Kirker, Anne (1986) Craftsman House

External links 
Artist files held at:

 Robert and Barbara Stewart Library and Archives, Christchurch Art Gallery Te Puna o Waiwhetu
 Te Aka Matua Research Library, Museum of New Zealand Te Papa Tongarewa

1865 births
1940 deaths
New Zealand painters
University of Canterbury alumni
Ilam School of Fine Arts alumni
People from Christchurch
Burials at Linwood Cemetery, Christchurch
People associated with the Canterbury Society of Arts
New Zealand women painters
People associated with the Auckland Society of Arts
People associated with The Group (New Zealand art)